Potentilla rimicola is a species of cinquefoil-Potentilla, known by the common name cliff cinquefoil.

It is native to the San Jacinto Mountains in Riverside County of the Peninsular Ranges in Southern California where it is known from just a few occurrences, and to Baja California. As its name suggests, it has been observed growing on cliff faces, its taproot anchoring in cracks in granite rock and its foliage hanging.

Description 
Potentilla rimicola leaves are borne on long petioles, their palmate blades each divided into five toothed leaflets.

The inflorescence is a cluster of up to 20 flowers, each with five yellow petals under a centimeter in length.

References

External links
Jepson Manual Treatment — Potentilla rimicola
Potentilla rimicola — U.C. Photo gallery

rimicola
Flora of California
Flora of Baja California
Natural history of the Peninsular Ranges
Flora of Riverside County, California
Flora and fauna of the San Jacinto Mountains